Cranberry Rough is an  biological and geological Site of Special Scientific Interest in the parish of Hockham, east of Attleborough in Norfolk. It is a Nature Conservation Review site, Grade 2, and the Great Eastern Pingo Trail, which is a Local Nature Reserve, goes through the site. Part of it is a Geological Conservation Review site, and it is part of the Breckland Special Protection Area.  

The area is the site of a former lake known as Hockham Mere, which was drained and dried up by the middle of the 18th century.   It has swamp woodland, grassland, tall fen and a network of ditches and pools, with a diverse range of wetland plants and insects, especially butterflies, dragonflies and damselflies. Large areas are covered with sphagnum mosses. Its biogenic sediments contain a late-Devensian & Holocene pollen record.

References

Sites of Special Scientific Interest in Norfolk
Special Protection Areas in England
Nature Conservation Review sites
Geological Conservation Review sites